Estadio Colombino was a multi-use stadium in Huelva, Spain. It was initially used as the stadium for Recreativo de Huelva matches. It was replaced by Estadio Nuevo Colombino in 2001. The capacity of the stadium was 13,000 spectators.

References

External links
Stadium history
Estadios de Espana 

Recreativo de Huelva
Colombino
Sports venues in Andalusia
Football venues in Andalusia
Sport in Huelva
Sports venues completed in 1957
1957 establishments in Spain
2001 disestablishments in Spain
Sports venues demolished in 2008